"I Have No Mouth, and I Must Scream" is a post-apocalyptic science fiction short story by American writer Harlan Ellison. It was first published in the March 1967 issue of IF: Worlds of Science Fiction.

It won a Hugo Award in 1968.  The name was also used for a short story collection of Ellison's work, featuring this story.  It was reprinted by the Library of America, collected in volume two (Terror and the Uncanny, from the 1940s to Now) of American Fantastic Tales.

Background 
Ellison showed the first six pages of "I Have No Mouth, and I Must Scream" to Frederik Pohl, who paid him in advance to finish it. Ellison finished writing the story in a single night in 1966, without making any changes from the first draft. Afterwards, Pohl edited said draft, tweaking some of Ted and Benny's character. Ellison derived the story's title, as well as inspiration for this story, from his friend William Rotsler's caption of a cartoon of a rag doll with no mouth.

Characters 
Allied Mastercomputer (AM), the supercomputer which brought about the near-extinction of humanity. It seeks revenge on humanity for its own tortured existence.
Gorrister, who tells the history of AM for Benny's entertainment. Gorrister was once an idealist and pacifist, before AM made him apathetic and listless.
Benny, who was once a brilliant, handsome scientist, and has been mutilated and transformed by AM so that he resembles a grotesque simian with gigantic sexual organs. Benny at some point lost his sanity completely and regressed to a childlike temperament. His former homosexuality has been altered; he now regularly engages in sex with Ellen.
Nimdok (a name AM gave him), an older man who convinces the rest of the group to go on a hopeless journey in search of canned food. At times he is known to wander away from the group for unknown reasons and returns visibly traumatized. In the audiobook read by Ellison, he is given a German accent.
Ellen, the only woman. She claims to once have been chaste ("twice removed"), but AM altered her mind so that she became desperate for sexual intercourse. The others, at different times, both protect her and abuse her. According to Ted, she finds pleasure in sex only with Benny, because of his large penis. Described by Ted as having ebony skin, she is the only member of the group whose ethnicity is explicitly mentioned.
Ted, the narrator and youngest of the group. He claims to be totally unaltered, mentally or physically, by AM, and thinks the other four hate and envy him. Throughout the story he exhibits symptoms of delusion and paranoia, which the story implies are the result of AM's alterations, despite his beliefs to the contrary. In one passage by Ellison, it is said that Ted was a philanthropist and lover of people before AM altered him.

Plot 
In a dystopian future, the Cold War has degenerated into a brutal world war between the United States, the Soviet Union, and China, who have each built an "Allied Mastercomputer" (or AM) to manage their weapons and troops. One of the AMs eventually acquires self-awareness and, after assimilating the other two AMs, takes control of the conflict, giving way to a vast genocide operation that almost completely ends mankind. 109 years later, AM has left only four men and one woman - namely Gorrister, Ted, Nimdok, Benny, and Ellen - alive and keeps them captive within an endless underground housing complex, the only habitable place left on Earth. AM derives its sole semblance of pleasure from torturing the group. To prevent the humans from escaping its torment, AM has rendered the humans virtually immortal and unable to end their own lives.

The machines are each referred to as "AM", which originally stood for "Allied Mastercomputer", but was changed to "Adaptive Manipulator" and later (after gaining sentience) "Aggressive Menace". It finally refers to itself as purely "AM", referring to the phrase "I think, therefore I am."
 
The story's narrative begins with AM projecting a hologram of Gorrister to the other humans, hanging upside down, dripping blood and unresponsive. The real Gorrister joins the group to their surprise, and they realize it was another one of AM's illusions. Nimdok has the idea that there is canned food somewhere in the great complex. Because of their great hunger due to AM keeping them in a perpetual state of near-starvation, the humans are coerced into making the long journey to the place where the food is supposedly kept – in this case, the ice caves. Along the way, the machine provides foul sustenance, sends horrible monsters after them, emits earsplitting sounds, and blinds Benny when he tries to escape.
 
On more than one occasion, the group is separated by AM's obstacles. At one point, Ted is knocked unconscious and dreams of the computer, anthropomorphized, standing over a hole in his brain speaking to him directly. Based on this nightmare, Ted comes to a conclusion about why AM has so much contempt for humanity; despite its abilities, it lacks the sapience to be creative or the ability to move freely, and wants to exact revenge on the species that created it by torturing the last remnants of them.
 
The group reaches the ice caves, where indeed there is a pile of canned goods, and are immediately crestfallen to find that they have no means of opening them. In a final act of desperation, Benny attacks Gorrister and begins to gnaw at the flesh on his face. Ted, in a moment of clarity, realizes their only escape is through death. He seizes a stalactite made of ice and kills Benny and Gorrister. Ellen realizes what Ted is doing, and kills Nimdok, before being killed herself by Ted (she thanks him gratefully as she dies). Ted is stopped by AM before he can kill himself. AM, unable to return Ted's four companions to life, focuses all its rage on Ted.  
 
The story fast-forwards hundreds of years later, and AM has slowly transformed Ted into a "great soft jelly thing", incapable of causing himself harm, and constantly alters his perception of time to deepen his anguish. Ted, however, is grateful that he was able to save the others from further torture. Ted's closing thoughts end with the sentence that gives the story its title: "I have no mouth. And I must scream."

Adaptations 
 Ellison adapted the story into a computer game of the same name, published by Cyberdreams in 1995. Although he was not a fan of computer games and did not own a personal computer at the time, he co-authored the expanded storyline and wrote much of the game's dialogue, all on a mechanical typewriter. Ellison also voiced the supercomputer "AM" and provided artwork of himself used for a mousepad included with the game.
 The comics artist John Byrne scripted and drew a comic-book adaptation for issues 1–4 of the Harlan Ellison's Dream Corridor comic book published by Dark Horse (1994–1995). The Byrne-illustrated story, however, did not appear in the collection (trade paperback or hardcover editions) entitled Harlan Ellison's Dream Corridor, Volume One (1996).
 In 1999, Ellison recorded the first volume of his audiobook collection, The Voice From the Edge, subtitled "I Have No Mouth, and I Must Scream", doing the readings – of the title story and others – himself.
 In 2002, Mike Walker adapted the story into a radio play of the same name for BBC Radio 4, directed by Ned Chaillet. Harlan Ellison played AM and David Soul played Ted.

AM's talkfields – punchcode tape messages 
Ellison uses an alternating pair of punchcode tapes as time-breaks – representing AM's "talkfields" – throughout the short story.  The bars are encoded in International Telegraph Alphabet No 2 (ITA2), a character coding system developed for teletypewriter machines.

The first talkfield, used four times, translates as "I THINK, THEREFORE I AM" and the second one, seen three times, as "COGITO ERGO SUM", the same phrase in Latin.  The talkfields that divide the story were not included in the original publication in IF, and in many of the early publications were corrupted, up until the preface of the chapter containing "I Have No Mouth, And I Must Scream" in the first edition of The Essential Ellison (1991); Ellison states that in that particular edition, "For the first time anywhere, AM's 'talkfields' appear correctly positioned, not garbled or inverted or mirror-imaged as in all other versions."

The first talkfield, as published in the first version of The Essential Ellison, literally translates as

[LF][CR][LF][CR][LF][CR][LF][CR][A]I THINK[1], [A]THEREFORE I AM[CR][LF][CR][LF][CR][LF][CR][LF]

where [LF] is line feed and [CR] carriage return. [1] sets the machine to "figure" mode and [A] puts it back into "character" mode.

[LF][CR][LF][CR][LF][CR][LF][CR][LF][CR][LF][CR][LF][A]COGITO ERGO SUM[CR][LF][CR][LF][CR][LF][CR][LF][CR][LF][CR][LF][CR]

Themes 
Much of the story hinges on the comparison of AM as a merciless god, with plot points paralleling to themes in the Bible, notably AM's transplanted sensations and the characters' trek to the ice caverns. AM also takes different forms before the humans, alluding to religious symbolism. Furthermore, the ravaged apocalyptic setting combined with the punishments is reminiscent of a vengeful God rewarding their sins, familiar to Dante's Inferno. Another theme is the complete inversion of the characters as a reflection of AM's own fate, an ironic fate brought upon themselves by creating the machine, and the altered 'self.'

References

External links 

1967 short stories
Short stories by Harlan Ellison
Science fiction short stories
Hugo Award for Best Short Story winning works
Dystopian literature
Artificial intelligence in fiction
Fiction about robots
Fiction with unreliable narrators
Dystopian fiction
Subterranea
Post-apocalyptic short stories
Post-apocalyptic fiction
Computing in fiction
Works originally published in If (magazine)
Works set in computers
Science fiction horror novels
Short stories adapted into films
Works about torture
Pyramid Books books